Ljiljana Vukajlović is a Serbian pianist and accompanist.

Education
She graduated from the Belgrade Music Academy, where she also completed her postgraduate studies in Piano Performance (1966) as a student of Professor Olga Mihajlović.

Career
In addition to giving concerts as a soloist and chamber musician, she served for many years as an accompanist at the Faculty of Music in Belgrade and Faculty of Arts of Priština.

References 
Pedeset godina Fakulteta muzičke umetnosti (Muzičke akademije) 1937-1987 (1988), Univerzitet umetnosti u Beogradu, Beograd

Serbian classical pianists
Academic staff of the University of Arts in Belgrade
Academic staff of the University of Pristina
Living people
University of Arts in Belgrade alumni
Accompanists
21st-century classical pianists
Year of birth missing (living people)